Gorakhpur Urban is a constituency of the Uttar Pradesh Legislative Assembly covering the city of Gorakhpur Urban in the Gorakhpur district of Uttar Pradesh, India.

Gorakhpur Urban is one of five assembly constituencies in the Gorakhpur Lok Sabha constituency. Since 2008, this assembly constituency is numbered 322 amongst 403 constituencies.

In 2022 Uttar Pradesh Legislative Assembly election, Bharatiya Janata Party (BJP) candidate Yogi Adityanath as well as the incumbent Chief Minister of Uttar Pradesh won the seat by defeating Samajwadi Party candidate Sabhawati Shukla by a margin of 1,03,390 votes.

Members of Legislative Assembly

Election results

2022

2017

2012

References

External links
 

Assembly constituencies of Uttar Pradesh
Gorakhpur
Politics of Gorakhpur district